Diorchis is a genus of flatworms belonging to the family Hymenolepididae.

The genus has cosmopolitan distribution.

Species:

Diorchis acuminatus 
Diorchis americanus 
Diorchis brevis 
Diorchis bulbodes 
Diorchis danutae 
Diorchis diorchis 
Diorchis donis 
Diorchis endacantha 
Diorchis flavescens 
Diorchis formosensis 
Diorchis inflata 
Diorchis longicirrosa 
Diorchis longiovum 
Diorchis markewitschi 
Diorchis nitidohamulus 
Diorchis ovofurcata 
Diorchis paranansomi 
Diorchis parvogenitalis 
Diorchis ransomi 
Diorchis sobolevi 
Diorchis spasskajae 
Diorchis spinata 
Diorchis stefanskii 
Diorchis tuvensis 
Diorchis wigginsi

References

Platyhelminthes